Phoma herbarum is a fungal plant pathogen infecting various plant species, including Alchemilla vulgaris, Arabis petraea, Arenaria norvegica, Armeria maritima, Bartsia alpina, Capsella bursa-pastoris, Erysimum, Euphrasia frigida, Honckenya peploides, Matricaria maritima, Rumex longifolius, Thymus praecox and Urtica dioica.

References 

Fungal plant pathogens and diseases
Hop diseases
Hemp diseases
herbarum